Carathrips is a genus of thrips in the family Phlaeothripidae.

Species
 Carathrips ampliceps
 Carathrips bandeirantium
 Carathrips chamelaensis
 Carathrips delicatulus
 Carathrips ferrugineus
 Carathrips grandiceps
 Carathrips hemingi
 Carathrips impensus
 Carathrips interruptus
 Carathrips mediamericanus
 Carathrips pallidiventris
 Carathrips plaumanni
 Carathrips rufescens
 Carathrips sculpticollis

References

Phlaeothripidae
Thrips
Thrips genera